The 4th IAAF World Half Marathon Championships was held on October 1, 1995, from Montbéliard to Belfort, France. A total of 243 athletes, 147 men and 96 women, from 54 countries took part.

Complete results were published.

Medallists

Race Results

Men's

Women's

Team Results

Men's

Women's

Participation
The participation of 243 athletes (147 men/96 women) from 54 countries is reported.

 (6)
 (8)
 (3)
 (1)
 (7)
 (7)
 (2)
 (3)
 (8)
 (3)
 (1)
 (3)
 (1)
 (10)
 (1)
 (7)
 (10)
 (8)
 (3)
 (1)
 (1)
 (1)
 (4)
 (3)
 (10)
 (3)
 (9)
 (5)
 (1)
 (1)
 (1)
 (2)
 (6)
 (2)
 (9)
 (3)
 (2)
 (4)
 (5)
 (5)
 (10)
 (7)
 (8)
 (1)
 (4)
 (1)
 (4)
 (3)
 (3)
 (6)
 (10)
 (10)
 (3)
 (3)

See also
 1995 in athletics (track and field)

References

External links
 IAAF/Ricoh World Half Marathon Championships - Competition Result, website of the IAAF (Internet Archive) 
IAAF World Half Marathon Championships 1992-2005 Facts & Figures

IAAF World Half Marathon Championships
Half Marathon Championships
World Athletics Half Marathon Championships
International athletics competitions hosted by France